The IAFL is the Irish American Football League. It is an amateur American football organization in Ireland. It was founded in 1984, and it has two conferences which consist of 23 teams competing in the Shamrock Bowl Conference, IAFL-1 and IAFL-2

IAFL 2012 Regular Season Schedule Published
Dublin Rebels write-up of 2012 game results
NFL-Ireland reporting website announcement of doubleheaders

Note: W = Wins, L = Losses, T = Ties

North

South

References

American football in Ireland
Irish American Football League
IAFL
IAFL